Sasova may refer to several places in central and south-east Europe:

Šašová - a village in Bardejov District in north-east Slovakia
Sasova - a village in Turkey
Sasova, a village in Rebricea Commune, Vaslui County, Romania